Gulab-e Sofla (also Romanized as Gūlāb-e Soflá; also known as Gūlāb-e Pā’īn) is a village in Beyranvand-e Jonubi Rural District, Bayravand District, Khorramabad County, Lorestan Province, Iran. At the 2006 census, its population was 28, in 6 families.

References 

Towns and villages in Khorramabad County